The Pfarr Log House is a log cabin located near the village of Milford in rural Clermont County, Ohio, United States.  Built in the early nineteenth century, it provides a pivotal representation of the area's earliest built environment, and it has been named a historic site.  This cabin is known primarily as a property of the Pfarr family because it was purchased by George Pfarr in late 1840 as part of a 21-acre homestead, and it remained in the Pfarr family until it was sold to James Wiederhold in 1976.  George, a butcher and farmer, immigrated from Bavaria with his wife and three children, and the property was actively farmed until the 1960s by his children and grandchildren.

Although primarily a log building, the house rests on a stone foundation; the roof is metal, constructed with a very shallow pitch from the edge to the peaks of the gables.  The structure is one and a half stories tall with walls built of square-cut timbers, rather than unhewn logs.  The joints between the timbers feature a construction method known as "steeple notching", which was often employed in buildings constructed before 1825.

Comparatively little is known of the house's early history before the terminus ante quem of construction, 1825; a precise date of construction has not been established, and the builder's name is similarly unknown.  A newer farmhouse was built next to the cabin in the early 1900s, and when the Pfarrs expanded this newer residence, the cabin was moved in 1910 to make room.

In September 1977, the Pfarr Log House was listed on the National Register of Historic Places; despite having been moved in 1910, it qualified because of its historically significant architecture.

2022-06-28 
Correction to the picture and google pin information:
the Pfarr Log House is on the National registry but the picture  and google pin currently on this post is not accurate.  the log cabin on Olive Branch Stonelick Rd is a completely unrelated structure built by Mr. Damn as part of his pay lake in the early 1930's from logs harvested from the surrounding property.

References

Houses in Clermont County, Ohio
National Register of Historic Places in Clermont County, Ohio
Houses on the National Register of Historic Places in Ohio
Log cabins in the United States
Log buildings and structures on the National Register of Historic Places in Ohio
Houses completed in 1825
1825 establishments in Ohio